İskenderun Naval Museum is a museum in İskenderun, Turkey.

The building was purchased by the Turkish Naval Forces in 1942. Till 2008 it was used as an office. On 26 June 2009, it was opened as a naval museum.

There are six exhibition halls. The first hall is the memorial hall of 
Tayfur Sökmen (1892-1980), who was the president of the short-lived Hatay Republic, which was soon merged into Turkey in 1939. The second hall is the memorial hall of Şükrü Kanatlı (1893-1954)
 who was the first Turkish commander in Hatay. The third hall is named after Barbaros Hayrettin Paşa. Barbaros (1478-1546)
 was the famous Ottoman admiral of the 16th century. The fourth hall is Cezayirli Gazi Hasan Paşa Hall. Cezayirli Gazi Hasan Pasha (1713 (?)-1790) 
 was an able admiral of 
the 18th century. The fifth hall is Savarona Hall. MV Savarona was formerly the Turkish presidential yacht 
 in which Atatürk, the founder of Turkey 
spent his last days in 1938. The sixth hall is named after Rauf Orbay (1880-1964) who was the commander of the Ottoman cruiser Hamidiye and one of the last naval Ministers of the Ottoman Empire. He was also an active figure during the establishment of the Turkish Republic.

References

Buildings and structures in Hatay Province
Naval museums in Turkey
2009 establishments in Turkey
Tourist attractions in Hatay Province
Museums established in 2009